Johanna Sarah (Jo) Hardin is an American statistician who works as a professor of mathematics at Pomona College. Her research involves high-throughput analysis for human genome data.

Education and career
Hardin is a Pomona graduate, earning a bachelor's degree there in mathematics in 1995. She initially planned to do actuarial science, but was led to statistics by a faculty mentor, Donald Bentley.
She went to the University of California, Davis for her graduate studies, earning a master's degree in 1997 and a Ph.D. in 2000.
Her dissertation, supervised by David Rocke, was Multivariate Outlier Detection and Robust Clustering with Minimum Covariance Determinant Estimation and S-Estimation.

After postdoctoral studies at the Fred Hutchinson Cancer Research Center and Seattle University, she returned to Pomona in 2002 as a faculty member.
She considers John Crowley, her postdoctoral supervisor, to be her "closest mentor".

Recognition
In 2015 she was elected as a Fellow of the American Statistical Association.
She won the Waller Education Award of the American Statistical Society in 2007, and
Pomona's highest faculty honor, the Wig Distinguished Professor award for excellence in teaching, in 2016.

References

External links
Home page

Year of birth missing (living people)
Living people
American statisticians
Women statisticians
Pomona College alumni
Pomona College faculty
Fellows of the American Statistical Association
University of California, Davis alumni